Chalmers School of Entrepreneurship, CSE, is both an educational platform encompassing a Master’s Program and a pre-incubator. The Master's Program started 1997 and is a collaboration between Chalmers University of Technology and University of Gothenburg and has graduated over 200 students and the pre-incubator has a turned 27 technology based ideas into companies. These companies are valuated to 56 MEUR and has turnover on more than 14 MEUR.

Students 
Chalmers School of Entrepreneurship accept applications from students with 180 hec (120 Swedish college credits in the old Swedish system) with 30 hec in the area of innovation and entrepreneurship (most engineering, legal, economic or design educations qualify). In the two-year-long Master's Program the students are studying intellectual property, innovation management and business development in the program and in the second year the students are provided with a start-up project. In the second year of the education the students are matched with external idea providers to start up a real life high-tech innovation projects.

See also 
 Center for Intellectual Property Studies (CIP)
 Gothenburg International Bioscience Business School (GIBBS)

References

External links 
 Official homepage for Chalmers School of Entrepreneurship

Chalmers University of Technology
University of Gothenburg
University departments in Sweden